Phlegmacium cruentipellis is a rare species of agaric fungus in the family Cortinariaceae.

Taxonomy 
It was originally described in 2014 by the mycologists Ilkka Kytövuori, Kare Liimatainen, Tuula Niskanen and Balint Dima who classified it as Cortinarius cruentipellis. It was placed in the (subgenus Phlegmacium) of the large mushroom genus Cortinarius.

In 2022 the species was transferred from Cortinarius and reclassified as Phlegmacium cruentipellis based on genomic data.

Description 
It is yellowish brown in the center, becoming more yellow towards the cap margin.

Etymology 
The specific epithet cruentipellis refers the blood red droplets in the cap cuticle.

Habitat and distribution 
It is found in northern Europe—Estonia, Denmark, Norway, and Sweden—where it grows on the ground in temperate and hemiboreal forests dominated by hazel and oak trees, and also in wooded pastures and parks.

See also

List of Cortinarius species

References

External links

cruentipellis
Fungi described in 2014
Fungi of Europe